Bart Spring in 't Veld (born 18 September 1976 in Roelofarendsveen) is a Dutch television producer and the first winner of Big Brother in the world: in 1999 he won the first Big Brother in the Netherlands. Ever since then, he has been trying to rid himself of the image created by the show that he claimed 'stole [his] life'.

In an interview with The Times newspaper of London, Spring in 't Veld revealed to have suffered five breakdowns in the past eight years as he tried to get back his privacy, now in distaste over the celebrity culture, quoting:
"If it's true that I helped to create that mindless monster, I'm not too proud of it...Big Brother took away the need to make inspiring programmes and replaced them with mindless chatter. It's time to put it in a museum for weird artefacts of television history."

References

External links
Big Brother stole my life

1976 births
Living people
Big Brother (franchise) winners
Big Brother (Dutch TV series)